Moserius percoi is a species of woodlouse in the family Trichoniscidae. It is endemic to Slovenia.

References

Crustaceans described in 1940
Woodlice of Europe
Endemic arthropods of Slovenia
Taxonomy articles created by Polbot